Microsoft Voice Command is an application which can control Windows Mobile devices by voice. The first version was announced in November 2003 and it was supported in the United Kingdom, United States, France, and Germany.

Windows Mobile 6.5 had Microsoft TellMe integration, software created by a company Microsoft had recently acquired. This feature was later implemented in Windows Phone as a part of Bing Mobile.

See also 
 Speech recognition
 Speech synthesis
 Voice control
 Microsoft Cortana

References

External links 

 How To Use Speech Recognition in Windows XP
 Microsoft speech page

Voice Command
Pocket PC software
Windows Mobile Standard software
Speech recognition software
2003 software